Mary Daly,  is an Irish sociologist and academic. Since 2012, she has been Professor of Sociology and Social Policy at the University of Oxford and a Fellow of Green Templeton College, Oxford. She previously researched and/or taught at the University of Limerick, the Institute of Public Administration, University College Dublin, the European University Institute, the Institute of Social Policy, University of Göttingen, and at Queen's University Belfast.

Honours
In 2010, Daly was elected a member of the Royal Irish Academy (MRIA), the all-Ireland's academy for the sciences and humanities. In 2016, she was elected a Fellow of the Academy of Social Sciences (FAcSS). In July 2017, she was elected a Fellow of the British Academy (FBA), the United Kingdom's national academy for the humanities and social sciences.

Selected works

References

Living people
Irish sociologists
Academics of social policy
Academics of the University of Oxford
Fellows of the British Academy
Members of the Royal Irish Academy
Fellows of Green Templeton College, Oxford
Fellows of the Academy of Social Sciences
Year of birth missing (living people)